The 51st Golden Globe Awards, honoring the best in film and television for 1993, were held on January 22, 1994, at the Beverly Hilton Hotel in Beverly Hills, California. The nominations were announced on December 22, 1993.

Winners and nominees

Film 

The following films received multiple nominations:

The following films received multiple wins:

Television 

The following programs received multiple nominations:

The following films and programs received multiple wins:

Ceremony

Presenters 

 Alan Alda
 Clint Black
 Pierce Brosnan
 Carol Burnett
 Kate Capshaw
 Tia Carrere
 Joan Chen
 Jeff Conaway
 John Corbett
 Tim Daly
 Laura Dern
 William Devane
 Morgan Freeman
 Andy Garcia
 Teri Garr
 Jeff Goldblum
 Lisa Hartman
 Charlton Heston
 Val Kilmer
 Angela Lansbury
 Juliette Lewis
 Marlee Matlin
 Al Pacino
 Gregory Peck
 Stefanie Powers
 Jason Priestley
 Maximilian Schell
 Christian Slater
 Wes Studi
 Courtney Thorne-Smith
 Jennifer Tilly
 Lindsay Wagner
 Robert Wagner
 Lesley Ann Warren
 Sam Waterston
 Alfre Woodard
 Vivian Wu
 Sean Young

Awards breakdown 
The following networks received multiple nominations:

The following network received multiple wins:

See also
 66th Academy Awards
 14th Golden Raspberry Awards
 45th Primetime Emmy Awards
 46th Primetime Emmy Awards
 47th British Academy Film Awards
 48th Tony Awards
 1993 in film
 1993 in American television

References

051
1993 film awards
1993 television awards
Golden Globes
January 1994 events in the United States
Golden